Sajarak also known as Saraiki ajrak is a unique form of blockprinting found mostly in South Punjab in Pakistan. It has become a symbol of the Saraiki culture and traditions. On 6 March, Saraiki Cultural Day is celebrated.

Description 

Although the origins of Sajarak is disputed among Saraikis themselves since most consider it as a form of Ajrak. 

Sajarak is name derived from the original Ajrak which is the Sindhi version of the blockprinted shawls and tiles which are found in Sindh, Pakistan. 

Sajarak can be called the identity of Saraikistan and Saraki people. Sajrak is a symbol of pride and respect for men and glory for women. Saraiki people also present Ajrak as gesture of hospitality to their guests.

These shawls display special designs and patterns made using block printing by stamps. Common colours used while making these patterns may include but are not limited to blue, red, black and green. Cyan colour is the dominating colour in Saraiki culture. The Sajarak is mostly cyan and sometimes blue. The cyan colour makes it distinctive among other ajraks. Saraiki nationalists designed the Sajarak. Nationalists captured the heart of Saraiki belt, which Saraikies are proud on. The Sindhi Ajrak was used long ago. Some people call it Saraiki ajrak, but the majority know the name of the "Sajarak".

See also
 Saraiki shalwar suits
Saraiki literature
Ajrak
Saraiki people

References

External links 
سرائیکی اجرک (سجرک)

Pakistani shawls and wraps
Pakistani culture
Saraikistan